12 Cancri is a star in the zodiac constellation Cancer. It has an apparent visual magnitude of 6.25, placing just below the normal limit for stars visible to the naked eye in good seeing conditions. The star displays an annual parallax shift of 12.7 mas as seen from Earth's orbit, which places it at a distance of about 257 light-years. It is moving toward the Sun with a radial velocity of around −10 km/s.

This is an ordinary F-type main-sequence star with a stellar classification of F3 V, which indicates it is generating energy through hydrogen fusion at its core. It is spinning with a projected rotational velocity of 52 km/s and appears to be undergoing solar-like differential rotation with relative rate of α = .

References

F-type main-sequence stars
Cancer (constellation)
Durchmusterung objects
Cancri, 12
067483
3184
3184